Filamin-C (FLN-C) also known as actin-binding-like protein (ABPL) or filamin-2 (FLN2) is a protein that in humans is encoded by the FLNC gene. Filamin-C is mainly expressed in cardiac and skeletal muscles, and functions at Z-discs and in subsarcolemmal regions.

Structure 
Filamin-C is a 290.8 kDa protein composed of 2725 amino acids. Filamin-C, like the ubiquitously-expressed isoform Filamin-A, have an N-terminal filamentous actin-binding domain, followed by a lengthy C-terminal self-association domain containing a series of immunoglobulin-like domains, and a membrane glycoprotein-binding domain. Filamin-C interacts with γ-sarcoglycan and δ-sarcoglycan at the sarcolemma; myotilin and FATZ/calsarcin/myozenin at Z-lines, as well as LL5β. Filamin-C has also been shown to interact with INPPL1, KCND2, and MAP2K4.

Function 
The family of Filamin proteins crosslink actin filaments into orthogonal networks in cortical cytoplasm and participate in the anchoring of membrane proteins for the actin cytoskeleton. However, the precise function of the Filamin-C isoform is still under investigation. As Filamin-C is localized mainly to striated muscle, its functions are likely specific to the specialized sarcomeric cytoskeleton present in muscle. As Filamin-C is found at both subsarcolemmal regions and at Z-lines, one plausible function of Filamin-C would be to act as a mode of communication between the membrane and the sarcomere. In skeletal muscle, Filamin-C is found at sites of core formation in skeletal myopathies, and alterations in subcellular localization of Filamin-C have been exhibited in limb-girdle muscular dystrophy and Duchenne muscular dystrophy.

Clinical significance 
Mutations in Filamin C have been associated with human hypertrophic cardiomyopathy, restrictive cardiomyopathy and a higher incidence of sudden cardiac death. Expression of mutant protein in rat cardiac cells demonstrated that mutant Filamin C forms aggregates, which may provide a mechanistic link to the observed cardiac dysfunction. Deficiency of this protein has been associated with muscle weakness.

References

Further reading

External links 
Mass spectrometry characterization of human FLNC at COPaKB 
 GeneReviews/NIH/NCBI/UW entry on Myofibrillar Myopathy